Imperium is a 4X strategy video game published by Electronic Arts in 1990 for the Amiga, Atari ST, and DOS.

Plot
Imperium is a space adventure in which the goal is to either dominate the entire galaxy or live to be 1,000 years of age. The player controls all elements, from political to military, endeavoring not only to spread the empire's influence but also to prevent other empires from influencing the player's territory. The player maintains invasion forces, the building of fleets, and ensuring subordinates remain loyal, and can have the computer control the empire's economics, defense, and diplomacy.

Gameplay
Imperium is icon- and window-driven. Icons allow the player to save and load games, establish alliances and embargoes, review wealth, deploy forces and fight, check maps, and gather news and reports. The players can set windows around the screen, which contain selection areas to either type in data or click a button to retrieve additional data. All icons and all but one window, with attendant information, are displayed in monochrome.

Reception
The game was reviewed in 1991 in Dragon #165 by Hartley, Patricia, and Kirk Lesser in "The Role of Computers" column. The reviewers gave the game 4 out of 5 stars. Computer Gaming World in 1991 criticized Imperiums production values as "not what would be expected in an American game", but praised the gameplay and the computer opponent. The magazine concluded that "due to its strategic complexity and depth of play, it is certain to give any strategic gamer plenty of hours of enjoyment". In a 1992 survey of science fiction games the magazine gave the title four of five stars, stating that the game "seemed to quickly disappear from the market. Yet its rich texture and gameplay deserve a second look". A 1994 survey of strategic space games set in the year 2000 and later gave the game three-plus stars.

Reviews
ST Format - Jul, 1990
Computer Gaming World - Nov, 1992
Tilt - Sep, 1990
ASM (Aktueller Software Markt) - Feb, 1991
ASM (Aktueller Software Markt) - Jul, 1990

References

External links

Imperium at the Hall of Light
Review in Compute!
Review in Info
Review in Page 6

1990 video games
4X video games
Amiga games
Atari ST games
DOS games
Electronic Arts games
Monochrome video games
Video games developed in the United Kingdom
Video games scored by Barry Leitch